Ilya Tyapkin (born August 2, 1991 in Kara-Balta) is a Kyrgyzstani marathon runner. He competed at the 2016 Summer Olympics in the men's marathon, in which he placed 86th.

Tyapkin won the Tashkent Marathon in 2022.

References

External links
 

1991 births
Living people
People from Kara-Balta
Kyrgyzstani people of Russian descent
Kyrgyzstani male marathon runners
Olympic athletes of Kyrgyzstan
Athletes (track and field) at the 2016 Summer Olympics
Athletes (track and field) at the 2018 Asian Games
Asian Games competitors for Kyrgyzstan